William Bateman-Hanbury may refer to:

William Bateman-Hanbury, 1st Baron Bateman (1780–1845)
William Bateman-Hanbury, 2nd Baron Bateman (1826–1901)
William Spencer Bateman-Hanbury, 3rd Baron Bateman (1856–1931), Baron Bateman

See also
William Bateman (disambiguation)
Baron Bateman